Christopher Moore is the name of:

Chris Moore (businessman), CEO of Domino's Pizza UK & IRL
Christopher Moore (author) (born 1957), American author
Christopher G. Moore (born 1952), Canadian author
Christopher I. Moore, Brown University neuroscientist
Christopher Moore (Canadian historian) (born 1950), author and journalist
Chris Moore (producer/audio engineer) (born 1973), American record producer/audio engineer
Chris Moore (illustrator) (born 1947), English illustrator particularly noted for science fiction book covers
Chris Moore (film producer), American film producer
Chris Moore (footballer, born 1980), Welsh footballer currently playing for Chelmsford City
Chris Moore (footballer, born 1984), English footballer, played for Bishop Auckland, Darlington, Durham City, Gateshead, Spennymoor Town & Whitley Bay
Chris Masters (born 1983), American professional wrestler, also known as Chris Moore
Christopher Moore (born 1993), Young Money Entertainment recording artist better known by his stage name, Lil Twist
Christopher Liam Moore (born 1964), American actor
Christopher Moore (DJ) (born 1941), British/American radio broadcaster for Radio Carolina
Chris Moore (broadcaster) (born 1960) CBS Sports Radio Talk Show Host,"Mojo On CBS"
Christopher Moore (sculptor) (1790–1863),  Irish-born sculptor
Chris Moore (American football) (born 1993), American football wide receiver
Christopher Moore (Australian musician), Australian viola player
Christopher Moore (Minister), founder of the Chicago Children's Choir
Christopher Moore (American musical theatre writer/composer)(born 1960)
Christopher Moore (preservationist), born 1952, American historian

See also
Christopher More (c. 1480–1549), politician